Robert Brown Young (April 1, 1854 – January 29, 1914) was a Canadian-born architect who designed buildings in California.

Born in Huntingdon County, Quebec, Canada, on April 1, 1854, his parents were Alexander and Mary Ann (Dowler) Young. Young attended Huntingdon Academy. In 1877, he moved to Denver, Colorado, where he finished his education in construction and architectural drawing. He left thereafter for California, locating in San Francisco for two months before arriving in Los Angeles in the fall of 1878. He immediately opened up his office as an architect and general contractor.

Los Angeles at that time was a thriving city of about 10,000 and there were only two other architects here. Within a short time, demands for plans and architectural drawings were coming in far faster than he could handle them, and he was obliged to give up his work in contracting entirely and confine his attention to architectural work. During this period of building "boom", he had 87 buildings under construction at one time.

He was the resident architect of the new Orpheum Theatre in Los Angeles. and built many Catholic churches and schools in the diocese of Los Angeles and Monterey. He served as president of the Southern California Chapter of the American Institute of Architects.

In 1880, Young married Mary C. Wilson of Denver. Two children were born to them, Frank Wilson Young and Mary Elizabeth Young Moore. The son joined his father in the family business, and after the father's death, continued the business under the firm's name of R. B. Young & Son. Young died at his home in Los Angeles on January 29, 1914, after an illness of several months.

Works

Los Angeles

Apartment hotels: Seminole, Engstrum, Young, Westonia
Barker Brothers
Blackstone's Department Store
Garages: Kissel Kar, Mitchell
Hollenbeck Block home to the Hollenbeck Hotel, Los Angeles
Joseph E. Carr Building (1909) at 644 S. Broadway (Los Angeles), from 1947 to 1979 home to the Harris & Frank department store
Lankershim Block, SE corner of 7th and Broadway, demolished, home to the  Lankershim Hotel
Pettebone Building 510-512 S. Broadway
Rosslyn Hotel
St. Mary's Church,original church from 1897 to 1923

Elsewhere
State Reform School, Whittier, California
Masonic Temple, Corona, California
Reynolds' department store, Riverside, California
St. Andrew's Catholic Church, Pasadena, California
Yuma County court house, at Yuma, Arizona

Gallery

References

Bibliography

1851 births
1914 deaths
19th-century American architects
Canadian architects
Canadian emigrants to the United States
People from Los Angeles
People from Montérégie